Borut Božič (born 8 August 1980) is a Slovenian former professional road racing cyclist, who rode professionally between 2004 and 2018 for the , , , , ,  and  teams.

Considered a sprinter in the mold of Óscar Freire, Božič's career highlights include winning the 2007 Tour de Wallonie, victory in the first stage of the 2009 Tour de Pologne (plus two days in the leader's jersey), winning the sixth stage of the 2009 Vuelta a España, and winning stage five of the 2011 Tour de Suisse. Božič worked as a directeur sportif for the  team up to October 2019 but in that month was issued with a 2-year ban for his links to the doping ring uncovered by Operation Aderlass.

Early and personal life
Born in Idrija, Božič got his start in cycling at age 10, despite growing up in a family with no connection to the sport. Though his friends cycled, his dad was a football player – so he looked to his compatriot Valter Bonca for inspiration. Božič is married to Klemintina, with whom he has a son, Sas. The family resides in Idrija, Slovenia. During the first three years of his career, Božič also trained for skiing, though by age 24 he realized he could make a living as a professional cyclist.

Professional career

He moved to the Italian  in 2007, but left for Belgian squad  in 2008. He also won stage six of the Vuelta a España.

After extending his contract with Vacansoleil through 2011, Božič was able to train calmly during the winter, and he resumed his winning ways in 2010. Božič claimed stages 1 and 2 of the Étoile de Bessèges in France, and placed second on the third. He started the fourth stage as leader of the general classification, but lost over 20 minutes to eventual race winner Samuel Dumoulin. Nevertheless, Božič's consistency was rewarded with overall victory in the points classification, where he finished with 79 points, four more than the runner-up Niko Eeckhout of Belgium. Božič's next result of merit was a 12th-place in the  East Flanders classic, Omloop Het Nieuwsblad, where he arrived in the first chase group, 18 seconds in arrears of eventual race winner Juan Antonio Flecha. Unfortunately, the 2010 season was ultimately a quiet one for Božič, and he did not score a major victory.

In 2011, a frustrated Božič continued racing a similar program to years past, but he crashed out of May's Giro d'Italia and saw his progress disrupted. Taking into account their rider's two falls in Italy and general lack of results, the team reworked Božič's schedule and conceptualized an alternative approach according to Vacansoleil's sports director Jean-Paul van Poppel, who explained:

"Due to the crashes Božič couldn't follow up to a start in the Giro and get the results he was aiming for in the season. However, after the Giro we made plans with Božič. We decided he would firstly compete in the Tour of Luxembourg to build him up for races and then we agreed the Tour of Switzerland was a race that would help him get some good results in the Tour de France. The plan is coming together nicely."

Božič finally returned to the winner's circle on the UCI World Tour with a dramatic and emotional victory in the fifth stage of the Tour de Suisse.

Wiping the tears from his eyes while giving an interview immediately following his win, Božič told the press that he could not believe he had triumphed after such a long gap without a major victory:

"My last [big] win was in 2009, a stage in the Tour of Spain and even today I hadn't expected to do so well. I told my teammate Marcato to attack in the last kilometre because I felt a bit rough and that, if he couldn't make it, I'd try for the sprint. We were lucky it all worked out. I've had a very difficult last six months, no wins and never really feeling good on the bike. Today I thought it wasn't my day either but, with 50 meters to go, I got on Freire's back wheel, then got past him at the last possible moment."

Božič's win gave added impetus to his push for a coveted spot on Vacansoleil's Tour de France roster, and he ultimately made his first start at the race, taking four top-ten stage finishes.

Božič joined  for the 2012 season. In October 2015  announced that Božič would be part of their squad for 2016.

Major results
Source: 

2002
 1st Stage 5b Grand Prix Guillaume Tell
 10th Coppa San Geo
2003
 8th Gran Premio Industrie del Marmo
 10th Circuito del Porto
2004
 Tour of Slovenia
1st Stages 2 & 3
 1st Stage 6 Tour de Serbie
 3rd Overall Jadranska Magistrala
1st Stage 2
 3rd Omloop van de Vlaamse Scheldeboorden
 5th Grand Prix de Denain
2005
 1st  Overall Jadranska Magistrala
1st Stage 1
 1st Stage 3 Tour de l'Avenir
 2nd Poreč Trophy
 8th Overall Circuit des Ardennes
 8th GP Kranj
2006
 1st  Overall Jadranska Magistrala
1st Prologue
 Vuelta a Cuba
1st Stages 4, 11b & 13
 Tour of Slovenia
1st  Points classification
1st Stages 1 & 4
 Olympia's Tour
1st Stages 2, 3 & 8
 2nd Overall Circuit des Ardennes
1st Stage 1
 3rd Poreč Trophy
 10th Trofeo Zsšdi
2007
 1st  Overall Tour de Wallonie
 1st GP Kranj
 1st Stage 3 Tour of Ireland
 4th Tour de Rijke
2008
 1st  Road race, National Road Championships
 1st Stage 5 Étoile de Bessèges
 1st Stage 4 Vuelta a Andalucía
 6th Overall Delta Tour Zeeland
1st Stage 3
 6th Kuurne–Brussels–Kuurne
 9th Paris–Brussels
 10th Scheldeprijs
2009
 1st Stage 6 Vuelta a España
 Tour of Belgium
1st Stages 2 & 3
 1st Stage 1 Tour de Pologne
 1st Stage 1 Tour du Limousin
 3rd Overall Ster Elektrotoer
 3rd Paris–Tours
 5th Overall Tour de Picardie
 6th Overall Three Days of De Panne
 6th Hel van het Mergelland
 9th Paris–Bourges
2010
 Étoile de Bessèges
1st Stages 1 & 2
 2nd Overall Tour of Britain
1st Stage 7
 3rd Time trial, National Road Championships
 6th Overall Tour de Picardie
2011
 1st Stage 5 Tour de Suisse
 3rd Vattenfall Cyclassics
 4th Grand Prix d'Isbergues
 6th London–Surrey Cycle Classic
 6th Paris–Bruxelles
 7th Road race, UCI Road World Championships
 9th Memorial Rik Van Steenbergen
2012
 1st  Road race, National Road Championships
 2nd Clásica de Almería
 6th GP Stad Zottegem
 8th GP Ouest–France
 8th Grand Prix Pino Cerami
 10th Vattenfall Cyclassics
2013
 2nd Gent–Wevelgem
 2nd Dwars door Vlaanderen
 5th Grand Prix de Fourmies
 9th GP Ouest–France
2014
 3rd Dwars door Vlaanderen
 7th E3 Harelbeke
2015
 3rd Road race, National Road Championships
2016
 5th Route Adélie

Grand Tour general classification results timeline

References

External links

Palmarès at Cyclingwebsite.net
Official Vacansoleil team site

Slovenian male cyclists
1980 births
Living people
Slovenian Vuelta a España stage winners
Cyclists at the 2008 Summer Olympics
Cyclists at the 2012 Summer Olympics
Olympic cyclists of Slovenia
People from Idrija
Tour de Suisse stage winners
Slovenian sportspeople in doping cases
Doping cases in cycling
Directeur sportifs